Suzy González (born 1989) is an American artist and activist, she is known for her paintings and zines that explore social and political issues. She is part of the artist/art curation duo, Dos Mestizx, along with artist Michael Menchaca.

Since 2017, González has been an adjunct professor at Our Lady of the Lake University in San Antonio, Texas.

Early life and education 
González was born in 1989 in Austin, Texas and raised in Houston. González was raised Catholic, which she said had later informed her artwork in terms of recognizing the patriarchal role of religion and government. She has identified as Xicana, Queer, and vegan.

She attended Texas State University in San Marcos, Texas and earned a BFA degree in Studio Art in 2012. While attending college she co-founded the zine, Yes Ma’am. In 2015, González graduated with a MFA degree in Painting from the Rhode Island School of Design (RISD).

Artwork

Tasty Chick (2013) 
Created in 2013 and placed in a solo exhibit in San Antonio, Texas  in the Lady Base Gallery the same year. This piece is an acrylic and collage on canvas which González states was influenced by advertising images covered by Carol Adams. The piece contains the silhouette of a chicken with a collage of images that make up a two-piece bikini on the chicken. These images include multiple advertisements where a chicken is in a provocative or sexually suggestive pose. González attached actual advertising images in order to recognize the "sexualization of animals and meat" and focuses on the "consumption of birds and women".

Miss Drumstick (2013) 
This was created in 2013 and was later placed in a solo exhibit at the R Gallery in San Antonio that same year. In 2014, it was placed with the Young Latina Artists: Y Qué? Group Exhibit Mexic-Arte Museum in Austin. In this artwork, there are 6 legs. Some of them are made of wood while others are made of plastic. Above the legs hang two paintings of turkeys. The influence for this piece was taken from an image that González found in The Pornography of Meat  by Carol Adams. In this, over 20 pairs of female legs are underneath a sign with a turkey body. Above the sign are the words "MISS DRUMSTICKS 1953". The content came from a pageant held in Yellville, Arkansas. This is a part of the Turkey Trot celebration where the women are judged only by their legs just as animals that are only judged by the meat on their bones. With this work, González wanted to "create something that would undermine the pageant's implications of the sexualization of women's legs compared to that of turkeys". She also decided to go with secondary colors with respect to the way women are treated as the second gender in this world. The legs in this piece are meant by González to demonstrate how women have their bodies dismembered in advertising in order to enhance the effectiveness of that ad. This "relates to the actual chopping of animals into meat products". She feels that the mannequin-like legs are important, as she states that they are much like advertising, they are used to sell what should be considered appropriate boy types and clothing styles. Also, González has "covered each leg in different amounts of hair to display the wide range of how women treat their legs and bodies" and the legs are about the acceptance and the difference among bodies.

Assault (2013) 
This was created in 2013 and was placed in the Pale Firework Group Exhibit at the RISD Gelman Gallery in Providence, Rhode Island  and the New Talent RISD MFA Painting Group Exhibit at the New York Design Center in New York, both in 2014. This piece was created by using oil on a cut out panel and was inspired by a skinny cow advertisement that González thought that it was "nonsensical" as it contained a sexualized cow promoting her milk for the consumption of humans. This was painted like a traditional sign painting in order to keep the theme of advertising. According to Kathryn Eddy, it also suggests that her milk has made her skinny as well. She also notes that González replaces the cow's head with a violent object (a saw) in order to explain how one's identity is removed when they are seen as an object.

Universal Constructs (2013) 
Created in 2013, here González has created a diptych piece where one of the paintings is done with menstrual blood on paper and the other is with water color on paper. Universal Constructs depicts a range of social binaries such as the "dichotomies of culture/nature, man/woman, human/animal, oppressor/oppressed, and so on". Eddy states that the menstrual blood in this painting brings up the violence that happens against animals while connecting this to violence against women. Both paintings used to be the same shade of red, but the menstrual blood gets browner with time.

What Are the Conditions That Led Us to This? (2015) 
This collection of pieces was made through oil painting, spray paint, and digital printouts for Suzy González's MFA thesis in 2015 at Rhode Island School of Design. González has stated that the collection attempts to create a "Utopian space". In doing so, it also reflects on The Last Supper which shows patriarchal values. As a response to this, she uses a collection of female characters that each have their own background. Still, they are connected to one another.

One of the figures in this piece has been described by the artist as "The Acrimboldo-esque figure made up of fruits and vegetables [that's] representative of my own personal consumptions". There is also the figure with a broken wrist and leg which is made of tiles. This is a portrait of Ana Mendieta. Thirdly, there is a life-size doll made from corn husk. This is meant to "reflect on [González's] childhood, Native American cultures, and the exploitation of corn". Each figure in this work "acts as a piece of [González], or someone with whom [she] identif[ies]". By placing them with each other, they are meant to communicate as a group. Equally important, all of these characters have "ties to Latin@ cultures and speak of the reality of their struggles rather than their glorification". The struggles embedded within this piece are abortion rights, domestic violence, decolonization, the complex nature of gender, objectification, cultural appropriation, and stereotypes".

Lolita Devoured (2017) 
Since 2017, this has been held at The Sexual Politics of Meat Group Exhibit at The Animal Museum in Los Angeles, California. This piece can be described as triptych with oil on canvas. It's meant to "separate visual consumption, gustatory consumption, and the consumed individual". The heart glasses on the cow symbolize innocence and the development of sexuality. Also, González uses anatomical diagrams to compare our similar "make-ups". González reflects on what women are to sex as animals are to meat. Both women and animals are meant to be consumed with respect to sex and meat. With this, González has created something that "observes the gaze of the consumer and the distress if the consumed being".

Collections 
Suzy González's work is featured in various public art collections including the University of Notre Dame's Institute for Latino Studies, Texas State University, Rhode Island School of Design Museum, and at the Mexic-Arte Museum, among others.

References

External links 
 
 Interview with Newfound
 Interview with Third Woman Press

People from Austin, Texas
Texas State University alumni
Rhode Island School of Design alumni
Living people
Activists from Texas
American artists of Mexican descent
1989 births
Artists from San Antonio